Sawyer Nunatak is a small but distinctive nunatak standing 3 nautical miles (6 km) southeast of Mount Stephens in the Prince Albert Mountains, Victoria Land. Mapped by United States Geological Survey (USGS) from surveys and U.S. Navy air photos, 1956–62. Named by Advisory Committee on Antarctic Names (US-ACAN) for Joseph O. Sawyer, satellite geodesist with the McMurdo Station winter party, 1966.

Nunataks of Victoria Land
Scott Coast